John Griswold may refer to:
 John Augustus Griswold (1818–1872), American businessman and politician from New York
 John Ashley Griswold (1822–1902), attorney, judge and politician from New York
 John N. A. Griswold (1822–1909), American China trade merchant, industrialist, and diplomat